BAT99-7 is a WN-type Wolf-Rayet star located in the Large Magellanic Cloud, in the constellation of Dorado, about 160,000 light years away. The star has a spectrum containing extremely broad emission lines, and is the prototype for the "round line" stars, Wolf-Rayet stars whose spectra are characterized by strong and broad emission lines with round line profiles.

References 

Stars in the Large Magellanic Cloud
Wolf–Rayet stars
Dorado (constellation)
J04553134-6730028
032109